The 199th Infantry Brigade (Light) is a unit of the United States Army which served in the Army Reserve from 1921 to 1940, in the active army from 1966 to 1970 (serving in the Vietnam War), briefly in 1991–1992 at Fort Lewis, and from 2007 as an active army training formation at Fort Benning.

Early history
Constituted 24 June 1921 in the Organized Reserves as Headquarters and Headquarters Company, 199th Infantry Brigade, an element of the 100th Division. Organized in December 1921 at Huntington, West Virginia. Redesignated 23 March 1925 as Headquarters and Headquarters Company, 199th Brigade. Location changed 27 October 1931 to Parkersburg, West Virginia. Redesigned 24 August 1936 as Headquarters and Headquarters Company, 199th Infantry Brigade.

Converted and Redesignated 23 February 1942 as 100th Reconnaissance Troop (less 3rd Platoon), 100th Division (Headquarters and Headquarters Company, 200th Infantry Brigade, concurrently converted and redesignated as the 3rd Platoon, 100th Reconnaissance Troop, 100th Division). Troop ordered into active military service 15 November 1942 and reorganized at Fort Jackson, South Carolina as the 100th Cavalry Reconnaissance Troop, an element of the 100th Infantry Division. Reorganized and Redesignated 2 August 1943 as the 100th Reconnaissance Troop, Mechanized. Reorganized and Redesignated 7 September 1945 as the 100th Mechanized Reconnaissance Troop. Inactivated 11 January 1946 at Camp Patrick Henry, Virginia. Redesignated 15 October 1946 as Reconnaissance Platoon, 100th Airborne Division. Activated 2 December 1946 at Louisville, Kentucky. (Organized Reserves Redesignated 25 March 1948 as the Organized Reserve Corps; Redesignated 9 July 1952 as the Army Reserve). Reorganized and Redesignated 31 August 1950 Anti-tank Platoon, 100th Airborne Division. Reorganized and Redesignated 12 May 1952 as the 100th Reconnaissance Company, an element of the 100th Infantry Division. Inactivated 22 April 1953 at Louisville, Kentucky. Activated 9 April 1955 at Neon, Kentucky. Disbanded 17 April 1959 at Neon, Kentucky.

Reconstituted (less 3rd Platoon) 23 March 1966 in the Regular Army as Headquarters and Headquarters Company, 199th Infantry Brigade (3rd Platoon, 100th Reconnaissance Company- hereafter separate linage.) Activated 1 June 1966 at Fort Benning, Georgia. Inactivated 15 October 1970 at Fort Benning, Georgia.

Vietnam War

The unit was formed for the second time. It trained at Fort Benning, Georgia and Camp Shelby, Mississippi from September to November 1966 in preparation for deployment to Vietnam from Fort Benning, Georgia. The 199th was the only combat unit to train at Camp Shelby during the Vietnam War.

Nicknamed "the Redcatchers", the unit was hastily moved to Sông Bé, Vietnam on 10 December 1966 to provide an increased U.S. presence in the III Corps Tactical Zone and remained there until its return to Fort Benning on 11 October 1970, where it was inactivated. The unit was briefly reactivated at Fort Lewis Washington from the remains of the 9th Infantry Division.

The brigade was conducting Operation Uniontown in Đồng Nai Province when the 1968 Tet Offensive began. It immediately began a defense of U.S. II Field Force headquarters at Long Binh Post against attacks by the VC 275th Regiment. One battalion was moved by helicopter to attack a Viet Cong command post at the Phu Tho racetrack inside Saigon, then engaged in house-to-house fighting in Cholon.

During 1969, the 199th was responsible for the security of the region north and east of the capital, and in 1970 moved into the "Iron Triangle" when other units participated in the Cambodian Incursion.

Units assigned to the 199th Infantry Brigade (Light):
Brigade infantry
2nd Battalion, 3rd Infantry
3rd Battalion, 7th Infantry
4th Battalion, 12th Infantry
5th Battalion, 12th Infantry
Brigade artillery
2nd Battalion, 40th Artillery
Brigade reconnaissance
Troop D, 17th Cavalry (Armored)
Company F, 51st Infantry (Long Range Patrol)
Company M, 75th Infantry (Ranger)(Airborne)
Brigade support
7th Support Battalion
179th Military Intelligence Detachment
87th Engineer Company
313th Signal Company 
152nd Military Police Platoon
44th military history detachment
503rd Chemical Detachment
856th Radio Research Detachment (Army Security Agency)
40th Public Information Detachment
Other units on temporary duty
49th Infantry Platoon (Scout Dog)
76th Infantry Detachment (Combat Tracker)
3rd Squadron, 11th Armored Cavalry Regiment
Casualties
 754 killed in action
 4,679 wounded in action
The brigade was deactivated in 1970 until it was reactivated in 1991 and 2006, but some and few units of the 199th Infantry Brigade were retained by the army. When the tension was increased between the Warsaw Pact and NATO to breakout the war and necessary to be reinforced, the 199th Infantry Brigade will be fully mobilized immediately and sent to Berlin to take on the duty and defend.

Recent history
During the drawdown of the 9th Infantry Division at Fort Lewis in 1991–1992, a residual brigade, based around the division's 3rd Brigade, was briefly active as the 199th Infantry Brigade (Motorized) from 16 February 1991 before being reflagged on 16 July 1992 as the 2nd Armored Cavalry Regiment.

The structure of 199th Infantry Brigade at that time was:

 199th Infantry Brigade (Motorized), Fort Lewis
 Headquarters and Headquarters Company (HHC)
 1st Battalion, 29th Infantry(Possible)
 1st Battalion, 33rd Armor
 2nd Battalion, 1st Infantry
 3rd Battalion, 47th Infantry
 1st Battalion, 11th Field Artillery
 99th Support Battalion (Forward)
 Troop A, 9th Cavalry (previously Troop B, 1st Squadron, 9th Cavalry, rest of the squadron disbanded on the same date)
 102nd Engineer Company (Company D, 15th Engineer Battalion)
 9th Chemical Company
 Battery E, 44th Air Defense Artillery

Then-Lieutenant Colonel Peter W. Chiarelli commanded the 2nd Battalion, 1st Infantry.

On 27 June 2007, the 11th Infantry Regiment was reflagged as the 199th Infantry Brigade at Fort Benning.  In October 2013, the brigade underwent changes to its task organization as part of restructuring within the Maneuver Center. The brigade was designated as the Leader Development Brigade and reorganized to contain both Armor and Infantry BOLC, OCS, and the MCCC.
Units assigned to the 199th Infantry Brigade:
Headquarters and Headquarters Company (HHC), 199th Brigade (Maneuver Captains Career Course Detachment)
1st Battalion, 29th Infantry Regiment (Abrams, Bradley, Stryker, Sniper, Combatives, etc. instruction)
2nd Battalion, 11th Infantry Regiment Infantry Basic Officer Leader Course (IBOLC)
3rd Battalion, 11th Infantry Regiment (Officer Candidate School)
3rd Battalion, 81st Armored Regiment (administrative command, control, and support)
Army Noncommisioned Officer Academy
Command and Tactics Directorate (Infantry, Armor, and Combined Arms instruction)

In popular culture
Michael Lee Lanning, a retired lieutenant colonel, served a tour in Vietnam with the Redcatchers as a lieutenant. He reported to Vietnam where as a second lieutenant he served as an infantry platoon leader and reconnaissance platoon leader. After his promotion to first lieutenant, he commanded a rifle company, Bravo Company of the 2d Battalion, 3d Infantry. He wrote two books about his experiences there: The Only War We Had: A Platoon Leader's Journal of Vietnam (New York: Ivy Books/Random House, 1987); and Vietnam 1969-1970: A Company Commander's Journal (New York: Ivy Books/Random House, 1988).

Notes

References 
 
"The Brigade: A History, Its Organization and Employment in the US Army"
199th Infantry Brigade Home Page
 Roger W. Houston, From 9th Infantry Division to 2nd Cavalry Regiment, orbat.com archive.

Training brigades of the United States Army
199
199th Light
Military units and formations established in 1921